The 1946 Heywood and Radcliffe by-election was held on 21 February 1946.  The byelection was held due to the death  of the incumbent Labour MP, John Edmondson Whittaker.  It was won by the Labour candidate Tony Greenwood.

References

Heywood and Radcliffe
Heywood and Radcliffe
1940s in Lancashire
Heywood and Radcliffe 1946
Heywood and Radcliffe 1946
Heywood and Radcliffe 1946